Yin Zhe (1916–2005) was a People's Republic of China politician. He was born in Gaoyang County, Hebei. He was Chairman of the CPPCC Committee of his home province and Chinese Communist Party Committee Secretary of Qinhuangdao.

References

1916 births
2005 deaths
People's Republic of China politicians from Hebei
Chinese Communist Party politicians from Hebei
Chairmen of the CPPCC Hebei Committee
Communist Party Secretaries of Qinhuangdao
People from Gaoyang County